The Roman Catholic Diocese of Cruz del Eje is in Argentina and is a suffragan of the Archdiocese of Córdoba.  Bishop Santiago Olivera left on March 28, 2017 after being appointed Ordinary of the Military in Argentina.

History
On 12 August 1963, Saint John XXIII established the Diocese of Cruz del Eje from the Archdiocese of Córdoba.

Ordinaries
Enrique Pechuán Marín (1963–1983)
Omar Félix Colomé (1984–2008)
Santiago Olivera (2008–2017), appointed Bishop of Argentina, Military
Hugo Ricardo Araya (2017- )

Territorial losses

References

External links and references
Diócesis de Cruz del Eje official site
 

Roman Catholic dioceses in Argentina
Roman Catholic Ecclesiastical Province of Córdoba
Christian organizations established in 1963
Roman Catholic dioceses and prelatures established in the 20th century